Shahid Reza Chah Nasiri (also Romanized as Shahīd Rez̤ā Chāh Naṣīrī) is a village in Qaleh Ganj Rural District, in the Central District of Qaleh Ganj County, Kerman Province, Iran. At the 2006 census, its population was 125 people in 30 families.

References 

Populated places in Qaleh Ganj County